Acacia incanicarpa is a shrub belonging to the genus Acacia and the subgenus Juliflorae that is endemic to western Australia.

Description
The ribbed and hoary branchlets are often covered in scale or scurf. Like most species of Acacia it has phyllodes rather than true leaves. The 
They have one or three distant main nerves per face with many finer closely parallel nerves in between. It blooms from November to December or January to April producing yellow flowers.

Distribution
It is native to an area on the south coast in the Goldfields-Esperance region of Western Australia where it has a limited range within Cape Le Grand National Park to the east of Esperance where it is often situated on granite ridges and slopes where it grows in hollows of loamy sandy soils as a part of open scrub or heathland and low shrubland communities.

See also
List of Acacia species

References

incanicarpa
Acacias of Western Australia
Plants described in 1999
Taxa named by Bruce Maslin